Xylorycta polysticha is a moth in the family Xyloryctidae. It was described by Turner in 1939. It is found in Australia, where it has been recorded from Tasmania.

References

Xylorycta
Moths described in 1939